Cansler is a surname. Notable people with the surname include:

Charles W. Cansler (1871–1953), American educator, civil rights advocate and author
Larry Cansler (born 1940), American composer, arranger, conductor, musical director and pianist

See also
Candler (surname)